is a Japanese manga series written and illustrated by Masami Kurumada. It was published in Weekly Shōnen Jump between January 1977 and October 1981. The individual chapters were compiled by Shueisha into twenty-five tankōbon volumes. A sequel entitled Ring ni Kakero 2 was serialized in Super Jump between 2000 and 2008.

An anime adaptation produced by Toei Animation premiered in October 2004. It was followed by a second season premiered in April 2006, a third season in April 2010 and a fourth season in April 2011.

Ring ni Kakero is one of Weekly Shōnen Jumps best-selling manga series, with over 13million copies sold.

Plot
The story centers around the life of a young boxer named Ryuuji Takane and his sister Kiku, who is his coach. Ryuuji and his sister both inherited their father's talent for boxing with Ryuuji inheriting his strength and techniques while Kiku picked up his talent for analysis and strategy. In the past, their father was a famous boxer. Ryuuji and Kiku went away from home to train and become famous in order to help their lonely mother. On the way to stardom, they have to defeat the strongest challengers all over the world.

In Ring ni Kakero 1, the characters are briefly introduced, telling the story from the moment Ryuuji and Jun Kenzaki (his eternal challenger and supposedly best friend) fight for the National Boxing Title and having both achieved stardom. Ryuuji's sister then tells the story from the beginning which starts from when Ryuuji is the finalist in a local youth championship and had to compete against Kenzaki, the latter winning after an almost tie and K.O. one-to-one fight.

Afterward, most of the series tells about Ryuuji being the successor of Kenzaki (as the latter was terribly injured and almost crippled), who competes in the Japan National Boxing Championship, where he encounters strong and deadly opponents, including Ishimatsu Katori (a comic relief, but also a strong fighter), Takeshi Kawai (who specializes in the upper jab technique; he is also a pianist and also likes to cheat) and Kazuki Shinatora (who specializes in the Rolling Thunder technique; he is a former kendo practitioner, who retired when he challenged his father due to his cruel training).

Later on, the Jr. Japan team facing Blackshaft's team was adapted into an anime. Ryuji, Jun, Katori, Kazuki, and Takeshi represented Japan. Blackshaft had no intention of taking Japan seriously in a boxing match so he recruits Mick, leader of the Great Angels New York Branch (originally the Hells Angels in the manga), a deathrow inmate Monster Jail, Missie Charnel, a mysterious androgynous boy boxing champion known for his unhealthy obsession with his own beauty that knows no bounds (even in the ring) as well as that in which he savors reducing the "pretty" faces of any opponent he faces in the ring into mush, along with hypnotic powers that he casts upon his opponents to leave them as sitting ducks for his attacks and high-speed punches and fancy footwork, and N.B. Forrest, also known as the emperor of the south and a Ku Klux Klan member (in the manga). The second season ends with The Shadow clan, formed by a boxer who used the sweet science as an assassination art, aiming after Team Japan.

Characters

 
The main character of the series, Ryuuji is a fierce and spirited young man who is trained in boxing techniques by his older sister Kiku. He has strong skill in basic techniques like jabs and one-twos. His special attacks include the Boomerang Hook and Boomerang Telios.

Media

Manga 
Ring ni Kakero is written and illustrated by Masami Kurumada. The series was published in Shueisha's Weekly Shōnen Jump between January 10, 1977 and October 12, 1981. Shueisha compiled the individual chapters into twenty-five tankōbon volumes published between January 31, 1978 and January 15, 1983. The series was re-released into a 18-volume deluxe edition published between September 9, 2001 and May 6, 2002.

In 2000, a sequel entitled Ring ni Kakero 2 was published in Shueisha's Super Jump, a seinen magazine. Ring ni Kakero 2 tells the story of Kiku and Jun's son, Rindo Kenzaki, who is raised by Katori Ishimatsu after losing both of his parents. The series ran on an irregular basis until 2008. Shueisha compiled the individual chapters into twenty-six  tankōbon volumes published between July 9, 2000 and February 9, 2009.

Video game 
A video game titled Ring ni Kakero was released for the Super Famicom. It was available to download to writable Nintendo Power cartridges on June 1, 1998.

Anime
27 years after the first chapter debuted, the manga was finally adapted into an anime series by Toei Animation. The series premiered October 6, 2004 and was broadcast on TV Asahi. It covered the first story arc of the manga. Since Ring ni Kakero 2 was being serialized in Super Jump at the time, the anime was titled Ring ni Kakero 1 to distinguish it from the more current manga (the original manga was later republished under the anime title). A total of 36 episodes divided into four seasons were made, published in format DVD for the world market. A fifth season was planned but was canceled due to the death of the series character designer and animation director Shingo Araki in 2011.

Episode list

Season 1: Carnival Champion arc (2004)

Season 2: The Pacific War arc (2006)

Season 3: Shadow arc (2010)

Season 4: World Tournament arc (2011)

Reception
Ring ni Kakero is one of Weekly Shōnen Jumps best-selling manga series of all time, with over 13million copies sold.

References

External links

1977 manga
2000 manga
2004 anime television series debuts
2006 anime television series debuts
2010 anime television series debuts
2011 anime television series debuts
Animax original programming
Boxing in anime and manga
Masami Kurumada
Television shows written by Yōsuke Kuroda
Seinen manga
Shōnen manga
Shueisha franchises
Shueisha manga
Toei Animation television
TV Asahi original programming